Grevillea benthamiana is a species of flowering plant in the family Proteaceae and is endemic to the Northern Territory. It is a shrub with bipinnate leaves that have linear lobes, and reddish flowers that turn black.

Description
The end lobes are rigid and sharply pointed with the edges rolled under.

Taxonomy
Grevillea benthamiana was first formally described in 1986 by Donald McGillivray in his book New Names in Grevillea (Proteaceae), based on specimens he collected in 1978. The specific epithet (benthamiana) honours George Bentham.

Distribution and habitat
This grevillea grows in low, open woodland and is restricted to the plateaus and escarpments of the Daly River basin.

Conservation status
Grevillea benthamiana is listed as "near threatened" under the Northern Territory Government Territory Parks and Wildlife Conservation Act.

References

benthamiana
Proteales of Australia
Taxa named by Donald McGillivray
Flora of the Northern Territory
Plants described in 1986